CHOE-FM is a French-language Canadian radio station located in Matane, Quebec.

Owned and operated by Les Communications Matane Inc., it broadcasts on 95.3 MHz (FM) using an omnidirectional antenna with an effective radiated power of 14,600 watts (class B).

The station has a hot adult contemporary format. It is the sister station of CHRM-FM.

External links
 www.choefm.com - CHOE 95.3 FM
 
Decision CRTC 90-356

Hoe
Hoe
Hoe
Matane
Year of establishment missing